Paul A. Lombardo is an American legal historian known for his work on the legacy of eugenics and sterilization in the United States. He is currently a Regents Professor and the Bobby Lee Cook Professor of Law at Georgia State University in Atlanta, Georgia.

Career 
From 2011 to 2016, Lombardo served as a senior advisor to the Presidential Commission for the Study of Bioethical Issues. He worked on three Commission reports: Ethically Impossible: STD Research in Guatemala: 1946-1948 (2011), Moral Science: Protecting Participants in Human Subjects Research (2012) and Privacy and Progress in Whole Genome Sequencing (2012).

He testified as an expert witness in Lowe v. Atlas, a landmark federal genetic discrimination case, and his work was recently cited in a U.S. Supreme Court opinion, (Kristina Box, Commissioner, Indiana Department of Health, et al. v. Planned Parenthood of Indiana and Kentucky, Inc., et al (587 U. S.  (2019)).

In 2021 he received the Jay Healey Health Law Professor of the Year, from the American Society of Law, Medicine, & Ethics, and in 2019 he was named a Fulbright Specialist.

In recent years he has lectured in England, Austria, Italy, Russia, Pakistan and Canada, and at dozens of colleges and universities in the U.S.  He is regularly contacted as an expert by the media; recent interviews appeared on the  BBC, USA Today, New York Times, Los Angeles Times, San Francisco Chronicle, Washington Post, National Public Radio, the CBS Evening News, and Anderson Cooper 360. Lombardo is an elected member of the American Law Institute, a Fellow of the American Bar Foundation, and has been a consultant and participated in Study Sections, Special Emphasis Panels or Working Groups of eight different Institutes of the National Institutes of Health. He served as a committee member for the Institute of Medicine as well as the National Human Research Protection Advisory Committee; he was a charter member of the Central Beryllium Institutional Review Board of the U.S. Department of Energy.

He has published extensively on topics in health law, medico-legal history, and bioethics and is coeditor of Fletcher's Clinical Ethics, 3rd ed. (2005). His book Three Generations, No Imbeciles: Eugenics, the Supreme Court and Buck v. Bell (2008) was recognized at the 2009 Library of Virginia Literary Awards; it also earned him designation as a 2009 Georgia Author of the Year. It has just been reissued in a new, updated edition (2022). Lombardo also published an edited volume: A Century of Eugenics in America: From the Indiana Experiment to the Human Genome Era (2010).

In 2002, he sponsored an historical marker to mark the correcting of the historical record concerning the Supreme Court's infamous decision upholding the Virginia Sterilization Act of 1924 in the case of Buck v. Bell.  His advocacy for state governmental repudiation of past eugenic policies was successful first in Virginia and has extended to eight other states.

Lombardo has been a historical consultant for several films, including, Belly of the Beast, (Idlewild Films) PBS Independent Lens (2020), (The Lynchburg Story (Discovery Channel, 1993), Race: the Power of an Illusion Part I, The Difference Between Us (PBS, April 2003) and The Golden Door (presented by Martin Scorsese/ Miramax, 2006) a feature film released in the U.S. in 2007 that explored the impact of eugenic screening on early 20th century immigrants at Ellis Island. He also appeared as a featured commentator and historical consultant on PBS The American Experience: “The Eugenics Crusade” (2018), Hidden Brain (NPR Podcast) “Emma, Carrie, Vivian: How A Family Became A Test Case For Forced Sterilizations” (2018), and RadioLab (NPR Podcast)“G: Eugenic Sterilization” (2019).	

Professor Lombardo served on the Editorial Advisory Panel at the Cold Spring Harbor (NY) Laboratory's Dolan DNA Learning Center that assembled the digital Image Archive on the American Eugenics Movement, and was a consultant and contributor to DNA Interactive: Chronicle, a website that explores the history of eugenics alongside the history of genetics. He was also a contributor and consultant for the U.S. Holocaust Memorial Museum exhibit, Deadly Medicine: Creating the Master Race.

From 1985-1990 Lombardo practiced law in California. From 1990 until 2006 he served on the faculty of the Schools of Law and Medicine at the University of Virginia, where he directed the Center for Mental Health Law at the Institute of Law, Psychiatry and Public Policy and the Program in Law and Medicine at the Center for Biomedical Ethics. In 1997 he drafted Virginia's Patient Health Records Privacy Act.  Lombardo received his A.B. from Rockhurst College (Kansas City, Mo.), his M.A. from Loyola University of Chicago and both his Ph.D. and J.D. from the University of Virginia.

He joined the faculty at Georgia State University College of Law in 2006.  As a member of the Center for Law, Health and Society, he teaches courses in Genetics and the Law, Bioethics, Mental Health Law, the Legal Regulation of Human Research, and the Legal History of Eugenics in America.

References

External links
 Lombardo's faculty page at Georgia State University

Year of birth missing (living people)
Living people
American legal scholars
Rockhurst University alumni
Loyola University Chicago alumni
University of Virginia School of Law alumni
Georgia State University faculty